She is a 1916 British silent adventure film directed by Will Barker and Horace Lisle Lucoque and starring Alice Delysia, Henry Victor and Sydney Bland. It is an adaptation of H. Rider Haggard's 1887 novel She.

Cast
 Alice Delysia as Ayesha  
 Henry Victor as Leo Vincey  
 Sydney Bland as Horace Holly  
 Blanche Forsythe as Ustane  
 Jack Denton as Job  
 J. Hastings Batson as Bilali

References

Bibliography
 Goble, Alan. The Complete Index to Literary Sources in Film. Walter de Gruyter, 1999.

External links
 

1916 films
1916 adventure films
British adventure films
British silent feature films
Ealing Studios films
Films based on She
British black-and-white films
1916 lost films
Lost British films
Lost adventure films
1910s English-language films
1910s British films
Silent adventure films